Stuart Trott  (born 25 April 1948) is a former Australian rules footballer in the Victorian Football League.

He came from Frankston originally and is the great grandson of 1896 Test cricket captain Harry Trott.

Trott played with St Kilda from 1967 to 1974 (159 games) and later Hawthorn 1975 to 1977 (41 games). He played on the wing.

Trott played in two VFL grand finals, but never in a premiership side, he was in the 1971 with St Kilda and the 1975 with Hawthorn.

He was inducted into St Kilda's Hall of Fame in April 2016.

External links
Pic and brief details at Frankston Bombers site

Trevor Barker Award winners
Living people
St Kilda Football Club players
Hawthorn Football Club players
Frankston Bombers players
Caulfield Football Club players
Caulfield Football Club coaches
Australian rules footballers from Victoria (Australia)
1948 births